Shropshire is a county in the West Midlands region of England.  In 2009 the historic county was divided into two unitary authorities, Shropshire and Telford and Wrekin.  These two unitary authorities constitute the ceremonial county of Shropshire, which forms the basis for this list.  The county's economy is largely agricultural.  Until the creation of the new town of Telford in the 1960s, the largest town was its county town, Shrewsbury.  Shropshire is the largest entirely inland county in England.  Its churches are mainly constructed from local stone.  This is mainly sandstone, although there are limestone deposits in the northeast of the county.  The Triassic sandstone from quarries at Grinshill is considered to be one of the finest types of stone in the county for building.

Christian churches have been present in Shropshire since the Anglo-Saxon era.  Very few churches have retained Saxon features surviving from this period, the best example being St Giles, Barrow. Surviving Norman architecture is found more frequently; churches containing significant Norman features include St John the Baptist, Hope Bagot, St Edith, Eaton-under-Heywood, St Michael and All Angels, Lilleshall, and St Laurence, Church Stretton.  Otherwise, most of the churches in this list are in Gothic style, dating between the 13th and the 17th centuries.  There are three examples of churches from later periods, namely the Neoclassical Church of St Chad, Shrewsbury (1790–92), the idiosyncratic Church of St Michael, Llanyblodwel (1846–56), and Richard Norman Shaw's Church of All Saints, Richard's Castle (1890–92).

This list contains all the Grade-I listed churches and chapels in the ceremonial county of Shropshire recorded in the National Heritage List for England.  Buildings are listed on the recommendation of English Heritage to the Secretary of State for Culture, Media and Sport, who makes the decision whether or not to list the building.  Grade-I listed buildings are defined as being of "exceptional interest, sometimes considered to be internationally important".  Only 2.5% of listed buildings are included in this grade.

Churches

See also
Grade I listed buildings in Shropshire

References
Citations

Sources

 
Shropshire
 
 
Lists of Grade I listed buildings in Shropshire